Novaya Ivantsovka is a rural locality (a selo) in Zavolzhskoye Rural Settlement, Pallasovsky District, Volgograd Oblast, Russia. The population was 476 as of 2010. There are 5 streets.

Geography 
Novaya Ivantsovka is located on the Caspian Depression, on the right bank of the Torgun River, 11 km southwest of Pallasovka (the district's administrative centre) by road. Pallasovka is the nearest rural locality.

References 

Rural localities in Pallasovsky District